Sackets Harbor and Saratoga Railroad Company is a predecessor railroad to the Delaware and Hudson Railway's Tahawus Branch. It was not completed, although  of it was eventually built (as required by its charter) from Saratoga Springs to North Creek. It was chartered in 1848, incorporated 1852 and surveyed in 1853. Approximately  of disconnected grade was built in 1854. The railroad was then reorganized as the Lake Ontario & Hudson River Railroad. In 1902, the Board of Railroad Commissioners relieved the railroad (now owned by the D&H) of its obligation to build the railroad beyond North Creek, effectively extinguishing the concept of the SH&S.

Portions of the unfinished railbed may be found in Lewis County, and Warren County.

References 
 Unfinished Railroads of New York State
 SH&S Timeline
 History of the railroad under this name
 Overall history of the railroad

Defunct New York (state) railroads